Ramjin (also Romanized as Rāmjīn; also known as Ramandeh) is a village in Ramjin Rural District, Chaharbagh District, Savojbolagh County, Alborz Province, Iran. At the 2006 census, its population was 1,902, in 456 families.

Meaning 
The village of Afsharaye (Persian: افشاریه) Savojbolagh (Persian: ساوجبلاغ) in the city of Karaj.

According to Dehkhoda (Persian: دهخدا) dictionary: The village is located in the plain with temperate climate and 762 inhabitants. Its water is supplied from aqueduct and Kordan River.

Population 
According to the census of the Iranian Statistical Center in 2006, its population was 1, 902 people (456 households).

Migration of Afghans: Ramajin is an immigrant based on agricultural gardens and regional work. Most immigrants are Afghan nationals. There is no accurate census. Approximately 100 households.

Crops 
 Grapes
 Apples 
 Pears
 Peaches
 Nectarines

References 

Populated places in Savojbolagh County